Hoka Iwabuchi (1901 – 1956) was a Japanese painter. His work was part of the painting event in the art competition at the 1936 Summer Olympics.

References

1901 births
1956 deaths
20th-century Japanese painters
Japanese painters
Olympic competitors in art competitions
Place of birth missing